The  is a rapid transit line in Osaka, Japan, operated by Osaka Metro. Constructed under Midōsuji, a major north-south street, it is the oldest line in the Osaka subway system and the second oldest in Japan, following the Tokyo Metro Ginza Line. On line maps, stations on the Midōsuji Line are indicated with the letter "M".

North of Nakatsu it runs above ground in the median of Shin-midōsuji, an elevated freeway.

In June 2018, the Midosuji line is the most congested railway line in the Kansai region of Japan, at its peak running at 151% capacity between Umeda and Yodoyabashi stations.

Line data 
 Above-ground section: north of Nakatsu to Esaka; Esaka to south of Senri-Chūō (Kita-Osaka Kyuko Railway)
 Block signalling: Automatic
 Train protection system: WS-ATC
 Cars per train: 10 (1996 – present)
Stations equipped with platform screen doors: 16

Stations

Rolling stock 
 21 series (since 1991)
 30000 series (since 10 December 2011)
 Kita-Osaka Kyuko 8000 series (since 1987)
 Kita-Osaka Kyuko 9000 series (since 28 April 2014)

Former
 100 series (1933–1969)
 200 series (1935–1969)
 300 series (1938–1969)
 400 series (1943–1969)
 500 series (1949–1969)
 600 series (1951–1969)
 1000 series (1953–1969)
 1100 series (1957–1969)
 1200 series (1958–1969)
 50 series (1960–1969) 
 30 series (1968–1993)
 10/10A series (1973–2022)
 Kitakyū 7000/8000 series (1969–1970)
 Kitakyū 2000 series (1969–1993)

History

The Midōsuji Line was the first subway line in Osaka and the first government-operated subway line in Japan. Its construction was partly an effort to give work to the many unemployed people in Osaka during the early 1930s. The initial tunnel from Umeda to Shinsaibashi, dug entirely by hand opened in 1933 after being initially plagued by cave-ins and water leakage caused by the poor composition of the earth below northern Osaka and the equally poor engineering skills of the work crew. The first cars were hauled onto the line by manpower and pack animals from the National Railway tracks near Umeda.

Although the line only operated with single cars at first, its stations were designed from the outset to handle trains of up to eight cars. The line was gradually extended over the next few decades, completing its current length in 1987, making it the second-longest subway line in Osaka after the Tanimachi Line (excluding the Kita-Osaka Kyūkō Railway extension of the Midōsuji Line).

 20 May 1933 – Umeda (temporary station) – Shinsaibashi (opening). Trains started running in single car formation.
 6 October 1935 – Umeda Station (present station) opened.
 30 October 1935 – Shinsaibashi – Namba (opening). Trains started running in 2-car formation.
 21 April 1938 – Namba – Tennōji (opening). Trains started running in 3-car formation.
 Construction stopped during World War II.
 20 December 1951 – Tennōji – Shōwachō (opening)
 5 October 1952 – Shōwachō – Nishitanabe (opening)
 1 August 1953 – Trains started running in 4-car formation.
 1 April 1957 – Trains started running in 5-car formation.
 1 May 1958 – Trains started running in 6-car formation.
 1 July 1960 – Nishitanabe – Abiko (opening)
 1 June 1963 – Trains started running in 8-car formation.
 1 September 1964 – Umeda – Shin-Osaka (opening)
 29 August 1968 – 30 series EMUs began operation.
 24 February 1970 – Shin-Osaka – Esaka together with Kita-Osaka Kyuko Railway (Kitakyu) (opening). This section of track was the first in the Midōsuji Line to utilize Automatic Train Control instead of Automatic Train Stop. 
 1 April 1971 – Centralized traffic control introduced.
 16 February 1976 – 10 series EMUs begin operation.
 18 April 1987 – Abiko – Nakamozu (opening). Refurbishment of stations to accommodate 9-car trainsets began.
 24 August 1987, Refurbishment of stations complete, hence all trains were regrouped into 9-car formation.
 14 May 1991 – 21 series EMUs begin operation.
 1993 – All trains on the Midōsuji Line are fully air-conditioned after the withdrawal of the 30 series and the Kitakyū 2000 series the same year.
 9 December 1995 – Refurbishment of stations to accommodate 10-car trainsets began.
 1 September 1996 – Refurbishment of stations completed, hence all trains were regrouped into 10-car formation.
 11 November 2002 – Women-only cars were introduced.
 December 2011 – 30000 series trains entered service.

Women-only passenger cars
Women-only cars were introduced on the line from 11 November 2002. There is one such designated car in each train (Car No. 6), the use of which is restricted all day on weekdays.

References

External links 

Osaka Metro
Rail transport in Osaka Prefecture
Standard gauge railways in Japan
Railway lines opened in 1933
750 V DC railway electrification
Railway lines in highway medians
1933 establishments in Japan